Ronda AG is a Swiss manufacturer of quartz and mechanical watch movements.  The company was founded in 1946 by William Mosset and the current headquarters are located in Lausen, Basel-Landschaft.

Their movements are used in a variety of watches around the world, including RSC pilot's watches, Shinola and Mondaine watches.

References

Watch manufacturing companies of Switzerland
Watch movement manufacturers
Manufacturing companies established in 1946